American rapper Denzel Curry has released five studio albums, five mixtapes, three extended plays and 35 singles (including 16 as a featured artist).

Curry released his debut mixtape King Remembered Underground Tape 1991–1995 in September 2011. The mixtape led to him joining SpaceGhostPurrp's Raider Klan collective. In 2012, he released a second mixtape, titled King of the Mischievous South Vol. 1 Underground Tape 1996, which caught the attention of fellow American rapper Earl Sweatshirt. His third mixtape Strictly for My R.V.I.D.X.R.S. was released that same year.

In 2013, Raider Klan disbanded. Curry would go on to release his debut studio album Nostalgic 64 in September 2013. In June 2015, he released his first double EP 32 Zel/Planet Shrooms, which included his breakout hit "Ultimate", which has since amassed over 100 million streams on Spotify. He released his second studio album Imperial in 2016. The album's hype led to him being featured on the cover of the 2016 XXL Freshmen Class.

He released his third extended play 13 in  June 2017, followed by his third studio album Ta13oo in July 2018. It included the single "Clout Cobain", which peaked at number 6 on the Billboard Bubbling Under R&B/Hip-Hop Singles chart and was certified Gold by the Recording Industry Association of America. 

The album was followed by his fourth studio album Zuu, which was released in May 2019 to further acclaim.

In February 2020, Curry and hip hop producer Kenny Beats released a collaborative extended play titled Unlocked, alongside an accompanying short film.  In March 2021, Curry and Beats released Unlocked 1.5, a remix album of Unlocked. 

In March 2022, Curry released his fifth studio album, Melt My Eyez See Your Future. In September 2022, Curry released Melt My Eyez See Your Future (The Extended Edition), featuring reimagined versions of songs from the original album with live instrumentation performed by the Cold Blooded Soul Band.

Studio albums

Collaborative albums

EPs

Mixtapes

Singles

As lead artist

As featured artist

Promotional singles

Other charted songs

Guest appearances

Music videos

As lead artist

As featured artist

References

Hip hop discographies
Discographies of American artists